Terrence McCrea (born 31 December 1971) is a retired Jamaican hurdler.

References

1971 births
Living people
Jamaican male hurdlers
Central American and Caribbean Games gold medalists for Jamaica
Competitors at the 1990 Central American and Caribbean Games
Central American and Caribbean Games medalists in athletics
Place of birth missing (living people)